Balqis Sidawi (1935) is a Lebanese writer and poet.

Life
Balqis Sidawi born in 1935 in the city of Nabatieh, Lebanon. She studied in Biblical schools in Nabatieh, going on to study at the American Evangelical School in Beirut. From here she studied at the Community School in Beirut, receiving a degree in Arabic literature. Sidawi lived for a number of years in Freetown, Sierra Leone before returning to Lebanon.

She has written a number of poetic narratives, including Whispers from Saba (1998), Damua Sings (1998), Buqaya and Zul (1998). She has a poetic play titled Ray Me in the jungle (1998), and research piece entitled Marie Khoury. Balqis participated in several poetry festivals in Lebanon and wrote the official anthem of the Lebanese Civil Defense. She also read her poems on Lebanese radio and television.

References

1935 births
Lebanese writers
Living people